The Nazarene Theological College (NTC), located in Didsbury, south Manchester, is an affiliated college of the University of Manchester. It offers theological degrees in various specialised disciplines across BA, MA, MPhil, and PhD. NTC has its roots in the Church of the Nazarene and belongs to the World Methodist Council.

Courses
NTC offers a BA (Hons) in Theology, a BA (Hons)in Practical Theology, and a validated degree in Youth and Community Work. It also offers a Certificate in Theology (a one year course), and a Diploma in Theology (a two year course). NTC offers 10 MA degrees, including an MA in Biblical Studies, Theology and Compassionate Ministry and Humanitarian/Development Practices. Doctor of Philosophy (PhD) or Master of Philosophy (MPhil) are offered, with specialisms including: Biblical Studies, Wesleyan Theology, Missions, Church History, Wesley Studies, Christian Theology, Old Testament Studies/Second Temple/Inter-Testamental Studies, New Testament Studies and Biblical Theology, Practical Theology, Islam and Christian engagement and Missiology.

Manchester Wesley Research Centre
NTC is home to the Manchester Wesley Research Centre (MWRC) which collaborates with Oxford Brookes University in Publishing the Wesley and Methodist Studies Journal, published biannually by Penn State University Press.

The Centre is a working partnership between a range of institutions:
 Nazarene Theological College
 The University of Manchester John Rylands Library
 The University of Manchester Religions and Theology Subject Area
 The International Board of Education of the Church of the Nazarene
 Nazarene Theological Seminary
 Cliff College
 Point Loma Nazarene University
 Asbury Theological Seminary
 Asbury University
 Pentecostal Theological Seminary
 Wesley Seminary at Indiana Wesleyan University
 and Northwest Nazarene University.

Didsbury Lectures

For over 40 years NTC has hosted the Didsbury Lectures, which was inaugurated by F. F. Bruce in 1979. These lectures last four nights, and usually occur in the final few weeks of October.

Lecturers of the 1980s
 1980 The Revd Professor I Howard Marshall
 1981 The Revd Professor James Atkinson
 1982 The Very Revd Professor T F Torrance
 1983 The Revd Professor C K Barrett
 1984 The Revd Dr A R G Deasley
 1985 Dr Donald P Guthrie
 1986 Professor A F Walls
 1987 The Revd Dr A Skevington Wood
 1988 Professor Morna D Hooker
 1989 The Revd Professor Ronald E Clements

Lecturers of the 1990s
 1990 The Revd Professor Colin E Gunton
 1991 The Revd Professor J D G Dunn
 1992 The Revd Dr PM Bassett
 1993 Professor David J A Clines
 1994 The Revd Professor James B Torrance
 1995 The Revd Dr R T France
 1996 Professor Richard Bauckham
 1997 Professor H G M Williamson
 1998 Professor David Bebbington
 1999 Professor L W Hurtado

Lecturers of the 2000s
 2000 Professor Clark Pinnock
 2001 Professor Robert P Gordon
 2002 The Revd Dr Herbert McGonigle
 2003 Professor David Wright
 2004 The Very Revd Dr Stephen S Smalley
 2005 The Rt Revd Dr N T Wright
 2006 Professor Alan P F Sell
 2007 Dr Elaine Storkey
 2008 Dr Kent E Brower
 2009 Professor Alan Torrance

Lecturers of the 2010s
 2010 Professor George J. Brooke
 2011 Professor Nigel Biggar
 2012 Dr Thomas A Noble
 2013 Professor Gordon Wenham
 2014 Professor Frances Young
 2015 Professor Elaine Graham
 2016 Professor Michael J. Gorman
 2017 Professor Philip Alexander and Canon Professor Loveday Alexander
 2018 Professor Markus N. A. Bockmuehl
 2019 Professor Michael Lodahl

Lecturers of the 2020s
 2020 Professor John Swinton
 2021 Professor John M. G. Barclay
 2022 Revd Professor David Wilkinson

See also
Nazarene International Education Association
List of Church of the Nazarene schools

References

External links
 Manchester Wesley Research Centre

Bible colleges, seminaries and theological colleges in England
Didsbury
Further education colleges in Manchester
Universities and colleges affiliated with the Church of the Nazarene
Christianity in Manchester
Grade II listed buildings in Manchester
Grade II listed educational buildings